Chashm (also Romanized as Chāshm) is a village in Chashm Rural District, Shahmirzad District, Mehdishahr County, Semnan Province, Iran. At the 2006 census, its population was 483, in 126 families.

References 

Populated places in Mehdishahr County